Gornji Rogatec is a small village in the Municipality of Grosuplje in central Slovenia. The area is part of the historical region of Lower Carniola. The municipality is now included in the Central Slovenia Statistical Region.

Name
The name of the settlement was changed from Rogatec to Gornji Rogatec in 1955.

Church

The local church is dedicated to Saint Martin and belongs to the Parish of Št. Jurij pri Grosupljem. It was originally a Gothic building that was restyled in the 19th century.

References

External links

Gornji Rogatec on Geopedia

Populated places in the Municipality of Grosuplje